Éric Gauthier is a quebecois author who was born in 1975 in Rouyn-Noranda, in the Abitibi region of Quebec.

Biography 

After a childhood spent in Abitibi, and computer science studies in Ottawa, Éric Gauthier moved to Montreal. Though he had his first taste of the scene at a reading in Abitibi, he began his first forays into the art of storytelling at the Dimanches du Conte (Sundays of Storytelling) at the bar Le Sergent Recruteur in Montreal. He has participated in storytelling events for adults and teens, alone or with his Production Cormorant colleagues, in Quebec, the rest of Canada, and in France. Most of his stories are fantasy stories in which he visits many cultures around the world, which distinguishes him from many other Québécois storytellers who prefer a more traditional repertory.

Éric Gauthier is also a novella author specialising in science fiction and fantasy. He has won several literary prizes for Quebec science fiction, including the  Grand Prix de la science-fiction et du fantastique québécois in 2003 for his first release of stories on CD and his collection of short stories Terre des pigeons. He is the youngest person ever to receive this prize. The jury described his works as an interpretation of the literature of the world.

Storytelling 

 1999 :
 Frequent participation in Dimanches du Conte since 1999.
 2000 :
La Légende de la farine orpheline, multidisciplinary open-air production in Montreal
 Christmas storytelling show for convicts at the Rivière-des-Prairies jail
 2001 :
 Participation at three festivals : Le Rendez-vous des grandes gueules of Trois-Pistoles, Les jours sont contés of l'Estrie and the Festival interculturel du conte of Montréal
 Solo production Le Monde à votre porte
 10 days of storytelling at the Maison du Québec in Saint-Malo (France)
 2002 :
 Participation at the first Festival Voix d'Amérique, at the Yukon International Storytelling festival (in English and French), at the festival Les jours sont contés in Estrie and at the Festival des Hauts Parleurs in Québec.
 2003 :
 Participation at the first De bouche à oreille festival in Montréal and at the Nuit internationale du conte in Acadie (in English and French)
 Shows at the National Arts Centre in (Ottawa) and at the Place des Arts in Montréal.
 2004 :
 Organisation and participation in storytelling events in Montréal, co-foundation of the Productions Cormoran.
 Participation at the festival De bouche à oreille, at the literary cabaret Planète rebelle, and in English at the Ottawa Storytelling Festival.
 New solo show : Le petit théâtre des temps modernes
 2005 :
 Toured with the Pelleteux d'légendes in Brittany (France)

Literary prizes 

 1999 : prix Solaris (for La Maison de l'anxitecte)
 2000 : prix Boréal (prize for the best novella for Souvenir du Saudade Express)
 2000: prix Aurora (prize for the best French novella for Souvenir du Saudade Express)
 2002 : prix Solaris (for Feu sacré)
 2003 : Grand Prix de la science-fiction et du fantastique québécois (for the collection Terre des pigeons, the novellas Feu sacré and Un visage à la fenêtre)
 2006 : prix Boréal (prize for best novella for Au jardin comme à la guerre)

External links 
 http://ericgauthier.net/ (Official site (French))

1975 births
Canadian science fiction writers
Canadian short story writers in French
Living people
People from Rouyn-Noranda
Canadian novelists in French
Canadian male short story writers
Canadian male novelists
20th-century Canadian novelists
20th-century Canadian short story writers
20th-century Canadian male writers
21st-century Canadian novelists
21st-century Canadian short story writers
21st-century Canadian male writers
French Quebecers